The Zimbru Stadium is a football-specific stadium in Chișinău, Moldova, completed in May 2006 with a capacity of 10,400 people, corresponds to all norms required by UEFA and FIFA for national and international matches. It is currently used mostly for football matches and is the home stadium of Zimbru Chișinău and the Moldova national football team.

Architecture
The construction of the stadium took 27 months to complete at a cost of almost US$11 million.

Conditions
The VIP box is reserved for 250 people. Sports journalists have 44 places at their disposal. The arena meets all the requirements for holding official international matches.

References

FC Zimbru Chișinău
Football venues in Moldova
Moldova
Sport in Chișinău
Multi-purpose stadiums
Moldova national football team
Sports venues completed in 2006
2006 establishments in Moldova